Arthur Douglas Hotaling (February 3, 1873 – July 13, 1938) was an American film director, producer and writer.  He directed 113 films between 1910 and 1928, including the 1914 film Outwitting Dad, which featured the onscreen debut of Oliver Hardy.

Hotaling was born in New York City. In August 1902 he married Maye Shearor who became the silent film actress Mae Hotely, her stage name was a play on his name. She appeared in some of his films and he also acted in some of them.

He worked for Lubin for 11 years including time at the company's Jacksonville film studio. He died in California from a heart attack.

Selected filmography
As a director:
 Outwitting Dad (1914)
 He Won a Ranch (1914)
 The Particular Cowboys (1914)
 For Two Pins (1914)
 She Was the Other (1914)
 The Servant Girl's Legacy (1914)
 The Twin Sister (1915)
 A Lucky Strike (1915)
 Matilda's Legacy (1915)
 A Gentleman Preferred (1928)

As an actor:
 With Kit Carson Over the Great Divide (1925)
 King of the Herd (1927)
 The Little Wild Girl (1928)
 Old Age Handicap (1928)

External links

1873 births
1938 deaths
American film directors
American film producers
American male screenwriters
20th-century American male writers
20th-century American screenwriters